Sarah Witry (born 6 September 2002) is a Luxembourger footballer who plays as a defender for Dames Ligue 1 club SC Bettembourg and the Luxembourg women's national team.

References

2002 births
Living people
Women's association football defenders
Luxembourgian women's footballers
Luxembourg women's international footballers